Lebanon Township is one of fourteen townships in Cooper County, Missouri, USA.  As of the 2000 census, its population was 333.

Lebanon Township was established in the 1820s.

Geography
According to the United States Census Bureau, Lebanon Township covers an area of 42.31 square miles (109.59 square kilometers).

Unincorporated towns
 New Lebanon at 
(This list is based on USGS data and may include former settlements.)

Extinct towns
 Byberry at 
(These towns are listed as "historical" by the USGS.)

Adjacent townships
 Palestine Township (northeast)
 Kelly Township (east)
 Mill Creek Township, Morgan County (south)
 Richland Township, Morgan County (southwest)
 Otterville Township (west)
 Clear Creek Township (northwest)

Cemeteries
The township contains Antioch Cemetery.

Major highways
  U.S. Route 50
  Route 135

School districts
 Cooper County C-4
 Moniteau County R-Vi School District
 Otterville R-Vi
 Pilot Grove C-4

Political districts
 Missouri's 6th congressional district
 State House District 117
 State Senate District 21

References
 United States Census Bureau 2008 TIGER/Line Shapefiles
 United States Board on Geographic Names (GNIS)
 United States National Atlas

External links
 US-Counties.com
 City-Data.com

Townships in Cooper County, Missouri
Townships in Missouri